Gareth James Edds (born 3 February 1981) is an Australian former professional footballer who played as a defender or midfielder. He was last employed as the head coach at Northern Fury in 2013.

Club career
Edds started his career in 1999 with English team Nottingham Forest after going through the AIS system in Australia. At Forest he scored once against Grimsby Town in 16 league appearances. He left for Swindon Town in the summer of 2002. However, he only played one season for Swindon before moving to Bradford City, where he again stayed for just one season. He moved to the newly named Milton Keynes Dons, where he played from 2004 to 2008, making more than 100 appearances. In his time at MK Dons he scored vital goals, including his last gasp goal at the end of the 2004–05 season, which kept the Dons in League One. In May 2008, following MK Dons' promotion to League One, he was one of six players to be released by the club. Following his release, he was signed by League One side Tranmere Rovers in June 2008 on a two-year contract.

On 11 May 2010 it was announced that Edds would not be offered a new contract and on 24 June 2010 it was announced that Edds had signed a deal with A League side North Queensland Fury

Managerial career
On 12 November 2012 he accepted the role of head coach of Northern Fury.

Career statistics

Honours
Milton Keynes Dons
Football League Trophy: 2008

References

External links

Oz Football profile

1981 births
Living people
Soccer players from Sydney
Australia youth international soccer players
Australia under-20 international soccer players
Australian expatriate soccer players
Australian expatriate sportspeople in England
Nottingham Forest F.C. players
Swindon Town F.C. players
Bradford City A.F.C. players
Milton Keynes Dons F.C. players
Tranmere Rovers F.C. players
Northern Fury FC players
English Football League players
A-League Men players
National Premier Leagues players
Association football midfielders
Australian soccer players